Byron "Whizzer" Raymond White (June 8, 1917  April 15, 2002) was an American lawyer, jurist, and professional football player who served as an associate justice of the Supreme Court of the United States from 1962 until 1993. By his retirement, he was its only sitting Democrat and the last surviving member of the progressive Warren Court.

Born and raised in a small homestead in Wellington, Colorado, White distinguished himself as a diligent scholar and athlete who came from a background of poor farmhands to become a consensus All-American halfback for the Colorado Buffaloes. After being the runner-up for the Heisman Trophy in 1937, he was selected in the 1938 NFL Draft by the Pittsburgh Pirates, leading the NFL in rushing yards during his rookie season. White studied tirelessly and graduated from the University of Colorado Boulder as class valedictorian, attaining a Rhodes Scholarship to study at Oxford University. After World War II forced him to return to the United States, he matriculated at Yale Law School, played for the Detroit Lions in the 1940 and 1941 seasons while still enrolled, and served as an intelligence officer for the United States Navy in the Pacific Theatre.

White graduated from law school with honors in 1946 and clerked for Chief Justice Fred M. Vinson. He eschewed work for a white-shoe firm and returned to Colorado in order to enter private practice in Denver as a transactional attorney. Minor work as the Colorado state chair of John F. Kennedy's 1960 presidential campaign led to him being unexpectedly tapped in 1961 for a position as U.S. Deputy Attorney General. He was successfully nominated by Kennedy to the Supreme Court the next year, becoming its first justice from Colorado. 

White espoused a pragmatic and staunchly non-doctrinaire judicial philosophy which strengthened the powers of the federal government, advocated for the desegregation of public schools, and upheld the use of affirmative action. Though expected to be a reliably liberal justice, he was by contrast a vociferous opponent of substantive due process, penning bitter dissents in both Miranda v. Arizona and Roe v. Wade. Furthermore, White wrote the majority opinion in Bowers v. Hardwick (upholding the ability for states to restrict homosexual conduct) and similarly dissented in Runyon v. McCrary (against the ability for the government to restrict racial discrimination in private schools) and Planned Parenthood v. Casey. Due to his unwillingness to align with either the liberal or conservative blocs, White was largely orientated with the Court's center.

Early life and education

Background 
Byron Raymond White was born in Fort Collins, Colorado, on June 8, 1917; he was the younger son of Maude Elizabeth (née Burger) and Alpha Albert White. Despite being poor German settlers that never attended high school, White's parents instilled a heavy emphasis on his education and took active roles in the local community. Both White and his brother, Clayton "Sam" Samuel White, were raised in the nearby town of Wellington where they attended the local high school. As a young student, White worked odd jobs to support his family during the town's decline in the 1920s; these included roles in harvesting beets, shoveling coal, and hard construction work among other forms of manual labor. In his junior year, he and his brother rented out land and spent long hours in the fields, during which time White adopted a nearly lifelong habit of smoking. Sam, four years White's senior, became an accomplished student and athlete that graduated as valedictorian, earning a scholarship to study at the University of Colorado where he was later elected by the university to become a Rhodes scholar. Whereas Sam was a gregarious and socially active child, White was described as a taciturn boy who "was very quiet, measuring every single word, showing no emotion, and revealing nothing."      

White excelled academically in high school, graduating in 1934 as the class valedictorian of his small class of six with the highest grades in the school's history. He studied diligently in order to attain a scholarship to attend college, later describing his philosophy in Wellington as "do your work and don't be late for dinner." White followed his brother's footsteps in attending the University of Colorado Boulder on the scholarship offered to all Colorado high school valedictorians, intending to go to medical school and major in chemistry. Though he joined the Phi Gamma Delta fraternity on campus, he stuck to a strict routine of working and studying with little to no social life. However, he would become a star athlete after playing as an All-American halfback for the Colorado Buffaloes football team, winning a series of victories to become among the most acclaimed players in the country. 

In 1935, Sam White was awarded a Rhodes Scholarship to study at Oxford University. After news of his brother's success became a local sensation, White saw his brother as an inspiration and felt pressured to achieve the scholarship himself. He served as student body president his senior year, switched his major to the humanities, and graduated Phi Beta Kappa and valedictorian from the University of Colorado in 1938 with a Bachelor of Arts degree in economics. In his last year, the Colorado Buffaloes went undefeated, and White's status as a football star earned him the moniker "Whizzer White" by the student newspaper. After months of study, White also attained the Rhodes Scholarship, deferring it for a year to play professional football before attending Hertford College.

Oxford 
On January 3, 1939, White departed to England aboard the SS Europa, arriving in Southampton on January 9 harassed by reporters wishing to see a "Yank at Oxford." Upon moving into Hertford College with the intent of studying law, he befriended the future mathematician George Piranian and was assigned with C. H. S. Fifoot as a tutor. White spent his days at Oxford tirelessly studying from day until night, becoming "the only Rhodes scholar who ever worked fourteen hours a day on his studies." During one Easter vacation, he became acquainted with Joseph P. Kennedy and future U.S president John F. Kennedy as their father, Joseph Kennedy, was the U.S. ambassador to London. In the period of political upheaval just before the Second World War, Oxford students—Rhodes scholars especially—took an active role in international politics, with many American Rhodes scholars beckoning President Roosevelt to take action against Spanish nationalists. White, however, remained closed in the affairs of politics, rarely speaking out and becoming estranged from other students; he prioritized his studies and physique above all else.

Following the end of a term, White spent a summer vacation touring France and Germany, settling down in Munich in order to study the German language and Roman law. He unexpectedly reunited with John F. Kennedy, who was on his own tour of Europe with Torbert Macdonald, and on one occasion the three were heckled by a mob who recognized their English license plates. As the oncoming war made it impossible for students—much less Rhodes scholars—to continue studying abroad, White left the country to return to Oxford in late August 1939, choosing to leave the university in order to continue his legal education at Yale Law School.

Law school and the NFL 
Upon enrolling at Yale, White continued his previous routine of studying fourteen hours a day, taking breaks only to exercise in the gymnasium where he would frequent the basketball courts—often clashing against Clint Frank in pick-up games. Despite attempts by the New York Giants and other NFL teams to get him to sign back into football, White publicly repudiated his football career, telling a local newspaper that "my football playing days are over. I'm started on a law career." At the time, Yale was home to a number of legal realists who rebuked Lochner, substantive due process, and were generally scholars with an expertise in legal fields outside of constitutional law. Two of such realists—Myres S. McDougal and Arthur Corbin—had a significant influence on White early in law school. Future justice Potter Stewart, one year ahead of him at the university, remembered White as "a serious-minded, scholarly, and rather taciturn (except when he found himself engaged in lively colloquy with J. W. Moore in his class on Procedure), and extremely likable young man with steel-rimmed eyeglasses."  

White earned the highest grades in his first-year class and was subsequently awarded the Edgar M. Cullen Prize, an award given to the highest-achieving first-year student. During the summer, he returned to Colorado and attended summer school at the University of Colorado Law School, got an appendectomy, and became a waiter at his old fraternity. White would turn down an offer to join the editorship of the Yale Law Journal, instead taking a leave of absence to promptly return to professional football as a member of the Detroit Lions, again leading the league in rushing in 1940. In three NFL seasons, he played in 33 games and led the NFL in rushing yards in 1938 and 1940. With an offer of $15,800, he was the National Football League's highest-paid player, and ultimately ended the season with the highest number of yards in the NFL at 514. Despite White's performance, the Lions had a largely mediocre season, disappointingly finishing in third-place with a 5-5-1 record. At the end of the season in December 1941, he returned to Yale to await a call to serve in the U.S. Navy after the Attack on Pearl Harbor; in May 1942, he was assigned to naval intelligence and spent weeks training at Dartmouth College and in New York City. His original intention was to join the Marines Corps, but was kept out due to being colorblind.

World War II 
In July 1943, White was stationed at Nouméa, New Caledonia, tasked with protecting Guadalcanal and Tulagi; he narrowly missed being assigned with John F. Kennedy, his former acquaintance who had also been stationed at Tulagi before being reassigned to the Russell Islands. During World War II, White served as an intelligence officer in the Navy, and was stationed in the Pacific Theatre.  He wrote the intelligence report on the sinking of future President John F. Kennedy's PT-109. For his service, White was awarded two Bronze Star medals, and was honorably discharged as a lieutenant commander in 1945.

Legal career

After his military service, White returned to Yale Law School, graduating in 1946 ranked first in his class with a Bachelor of Laws degree, magna cum laude, and membership in the Order of the Coif. White served as a law clerk to Chief Justice Fred M. Vinson of the U.S. Supreme Court from 1946 to 1947, then returned to Colorado and entered private practice in Denver with the law firm now known as Davis Graham & Stubbs. This was a time in which the Denver economy flourished, and White rendered legal service to the business community. White was for the most part a transactional attorney; he drafted contracts and advised insolvent companies, and he argued the occasional case in court.

During the 1960 presidential election, White used his status as a football star to aid him as chair of John F. Kennedy's campaign in Colorado. White had first met the candidate when White was a Rhodes scholar and Kennedy's father, Joseph Kennedy, was Ambassador to the Court of St. James's. During the Kennedy administration, White served as United States Deputy Attorney General, the number two man in the Justice Department, under Robert F. Kennedy. He took the lead in protecting the Freedom Riders in 1961, negotiating with Alabama Governor John Malcolm Patterson.

Supreme Court

On April 3, 1962, President Kennedy nominated White to be an associate justice of the Supreme Court, succeeding Charles Evans Whittaker. The president said of White—a longtime friend of his—that "he has excelled at everything. And I know that he will excel on the highest court in the land." White was confirmed on April 11, 1962, by a voice vote. He took the judicial oath of office on April 16, 1962, and served until June 28, 1993. His Supreme Court tenure was the fourth-longest of the 20th century.

Upon the request of Vice President-Elect Al Gore, White administered the oath of office on January 20, 1993, to Gore. It was the only time White administered an oath of office to a vice president. During his service on the high court, White wrote 994 opinions. He was fierce in questioning attorneys in court, and his votes and opinions on the bench reflect an ideology that has been notoriously difficult for popular journalists and legal scholars alike to pin down. He was seen as a disappointment by some Kennedy supporters who wished he had joined the more liberal wing of the court in its opinions on Miranda v. Arizona and Roe v. Wade.

White often took a narrow, fact-specific view of cases before the Court and generally refused to make broad pronouncements on constitutional doctrine or adhere to a specific judicial philosophy, preferring what he viewed as a practical approach to the law. In the tradition of the New Deal, White frequently supported a broad view and expansion of governmental powers. He consistently voted against creating constitutional restrictions on the police, dissenting in the landmark 1966 case Miranda v. Arizona. In that dissent, he said that aggressive police practices enhance the individual rights of law-abiding citizens. His jurisprudence has sometimes been praised for adhering to the doctrine of judicial restraint.

Substantive due process doctrine
Frequently a critic of the doctrine of "substantive due process", which involves the judiciary reading substantive content into the term "liberty" in the Due Process Clause of the Fifth Amendment and Fourteenth Amendment, White's first published opinion as a Supreme Court Justice was a joint dissent with Justice Clark in Robinson v. California (1962), foreshadowing his career-long distaste for the doctrine. In Robinson, he criticized the remainder of the Court's unprecedented expansion of the Eighth Amendment's prohibition of "cruel and unusual punishment" to strike down a California law providing for civil commitment of drug addicts. He argued that the Court was "imposing its own philosophical predilections" on the state in this exercise of judicial power, although its historic "allergy to substantive due process" would never permit it to strike down a state's economic regulatory law in such a manner.

In the same vein, he dissented in the controversial 1973 case Roe v. Wade. White voted to strike down a state ban on contraceptives in the 1965 case of Griswold v. Connecticut, although he did not join the majority opinion, which famously asserted a "right of privacy" on the basis of the "penumbras" of the Bill of Rights. White and Justice William Rehnquist were the only dissenters from the Court's decision in Roe, though White's dissent used stronger language, suggesting that Roe was "an exercise in raw judicial power" and criticizing the decision for "interposing a constitutional barrier to state efforts to protect human life." White, who usually adhered firmly to the doctrine of stare decisis, remained a critic of Roe throughout his term on the bench and frequently voted to uphold laws restricting abortion, including in Planned Parenthood v. Casey in 1992.

White explained his general views on the validity of substantive due process at length in his dissent in Moore v. City of East Cleveland (1977):

The Judiciary, including this Court, is the most vulnerable and comes nearest to illegitimacy when it deals with judge-made constitutional law having little or no cognizable roots in the language or even the design of the Constitution. Realizing that the present construction of the Due Process Clause represents a major judicial gloss on its terms, as well as on the anticipation of the Framers, and that much of the underpinning for the broad, substantive application of the Clause disappeared in the conflict between the Executive and the Judiciary in the 1930s and 1940s, the Court should be extremely reluctant to breathe still further substantive content into the Due Process clause so as to strike down legislation adopted by a State or city to promote its welfare. Whenever the Judiciary does so, it unavoidably pre-empts for itself another part of the governance of the country without express constitutional authority.

White parted company with Rehnquist in strongly supporting the Supreme Court decisions striking down laws that discriminated on the basis of sex, agreeing with Justice William J. Brennan in 1973's Frontiero v. Richardson that such laws should be subject to strict scrutiny. Only three justices joined Brennan's plurality opinion in Frontiero; later gender discrimination cases would be subjected to intermediate scrutiny (see Craig v. Boren). In Rostker v. Goldberg, White joined Brennan and Marshall in dissent arguing that male-only Selective Service registration was unconstitutional.

White wrote the majority opinion in Bowers v. Hardwick (1986), which upheld Georgia's anti-sodomy law against a substantive due process attack:

The Court is most vulnerable and comes nearest to illegitimacy when it deals with judge-made constitutional law having little or no cognizable roots in the language or design of the Constitution.... There should be, therefore, great resistance to ... redefining the category of rights deemed to be fundamental. Otherwise, the Judiciary necessarily takes to itself further authority to govern the country without express constitutional authority.

White's opinion in Bowers typified his fact-specific, deferential style, treating the issue in that case as presenting only the question of whether homosexuals had a fundamental right to privacy, even though the statute in Bowers potentially applied to heterosexual sodomy. Georgia, however, conceded during oral argument that the law would be inapplicable to married couples under the precedent set forth in Griswold v. Connecticut. A year after White's death, Bowers was overruled in Lawrence v. Texas (2003).

Death penalty

White took a middle course on the issue of the death penalty: he was one of five justices who voted in Furman v. Georgia (1972) to strike down several state capital punishment statutes, voicing concern over the arbitrary way in which the death penalty was administered. The Furman decision ended capital punishment in the U.S. until the court's ruling in Gregg v. Georgia (1976).  In that case, White voted to uphold Georgia's new capital punishment law.

White accepted the position that the Eighth Amendment to the United States Constitution required that all punishments be "proportional" to the crime; thus, in Coker v. Georgia (1977), he wrote the opinion that invalidated the death penalty for rape of a 16-year-old married girl. His first reported Supreme Court decision was a dissent in Robinson v. California (1962), in which he criticized the Court for extending the reach of the Eighth Amendment. In Robinson the Court for the first time expanded the constitutional prohibition of "cruel and unusual punishments" from examining the nature of the punishment imposed and whether it was an uncommon punishment − as, for example, in the cases of flogging, branding, banishment, or electrocution − to deciding whether any punishment at all was appropriate for the defendant's conduct. White said: "If this case involved economic regulation, the present Court's allergy to substantive due process would surely save the statute and prevent the Court from imposing its own philosophical predilections upon state legislatures or Congress."  Consistent with his view in Robinson, White thought that imposing the death penalty on minors was constitutional, and he was one of the three dissenters in Thompson v. Oklahoma (1988), a decision that declared that the death penalty as applied to offenders below 16 years of age was unconstitutional as a cruel and unusual punishment.

Abortion
Along with Justice William Rehnquist, White dissented in Roe v. Wade (the dissenting decision was in the companion case, Doe v. Bolton), castigating the majority for holding that the U.S. Constitution "values the convenience, whim or caprice of the putative mother more than the life or potential life of the fetus."

Civil rights

White consistently supported the Court's post-Brown v. Board of Education attempts to fully desegregate public schools, even through the controversial line of forced busing cases. He voted to uphold affirmative action remedies to racial inequality in an education setting in the famous Regents of the University of California v. Bakke case of 1978. Though White voted to uphold federal affirmative action programs in cases such as Metro Broadcasting, Inc. v. FCC, 497 U.S. 547 (1990) (later overruled by Adarand Constructors v. Peña, 515 U.S. 200 (1995)), he voted to strike down an affirmative action plan regarding state contracts in Richmond v. J.A. Croson Co. (1989).

White dissented in Runyon v. McCrary (1976), which held that federal law prohibited private schools from discriminating on the basis of race. He argued that the legislative history of 42 U.S.C. § 1981 (popularly known as the "Ku Klux Klan Act") indicated that the Act was not designed to prohibit private racial discrimination but only state-sponsored racial discrimination (as had been held in the Civil Rights Cases of 1883). White was concerned about the potential far-reaching impact of holding private racial discrimination illegal, which if taken to its logical conclusion might ban many varied forms of voluntary self-segregation, including social and advocacy groups that limited their membership to blacks: "Whether such conduct should be condoned or not, whites and blacks will undoubtedly choose to form a variety of associational relationships pursuant to contracts which exclude members of the other race. Social clubs, black and white, and associations designed to further the interests of blacks or whites are but two examples". Runyon was essentially overruled by 1989's Patterson v. McLean Credit Union, which itself was superseded by the Civil Rights Act of 1991.

Relationships with other justices
White said he was most comfortable on Rehnquist's court. He once said of Earl Warren, "I wasn't exactly in his circle." On the Burger Court, the chief justice often assigned important criminal procedure and individual rights opinions to White because of his frequently conservative views on these questions.

Court operations and retirement
White frequently urged the Supreme Court to consider cases when federal appeals courts were in conflict on issues of federal law, believing that resolving such was a primary role of the Supreme Court. Thus, White voted to grant certiorari more often than many of his colleagues; he also wrote numerous opinions dissenting from denials of certiorari. After White (along with fellow Justice Harry Blackmun, who also often voted for liberal grants of certiorari) retired, the number of cases heard each session of the Court declined steeply.

White disliked the politics of Supreme Court appointments, but had great faith in representative democracy, responding to complaints about politicians and mediocrity in government with exhortations to "get more involved and help fix it." He retired in 1993, during Bill Clinton's presidency, saying that "someone else should be permitted to have a like experience." When he retired, White had been the only Democrat on the Court. Clinton nominated (and the Senate approved) Justice Ruth Bader Ginsburg, a judge from the U.S. Court of Appeals for the D.C. Circuit and a former Columbia University law professor, to succeed him.

Later years and death
After retiring from the Supreme Court, White occasionally sat with lower federal courts.  He maintained chambers in the federal courthouse in Denver until shortly before his death. He also served for the Commission on Structural Alternatives for the Federal Courts of Appeals.

White died of pneumonia on April 15, 2002, at the age of 84. He was the last living Justice to have served on the Warren Court, and the last justice appointed by Kennedy; he died the day before the fortieth anniversary of his swearing in as a Justice. From his death until the retirement of Sandra Day O'Connor in 2006, there were no living former justices.

His remains are interred at All Souls Walk at the St. John's Cathedral in Denver.

Then-Chief Justice Rehnquist said White "came as close as anyone I have known to meriting Matthew Arnold's description of Sophocles: 'He saw life steadily and he saw it whole.' All of us who served with him will miss him."

Personal life
White first met his wife Marion Stearns (1921–2009), the daughter of the president of the University of Colorado, when she was in high school and he was a college football player. During World War II, Marion served in the WAVES while her future husband was a Navy intelligence officer. They married in 1946 and had two children: a son named Charles Byron (Barney) and a daughter named Nancy.

His older brother Clayton Samuel "Sam" White (1912–2004) was also a high school valedictorian and Rhodes Scholar. He later became a physician and medical researcher, particularly on the effects of atomic bomb blasts.

Awards and honors
The NFL Players Association gives the Byron "Whizzer" White NFL Man of the Year Award to one player each year for his charity work. Michael McCrary, who was involved in Runyon v. McCrary, grew up to be a professional football player and won the award in 2000.

The federal courthouse in Denver that houses the Tenth Circuit is named after White.

White was elected to the College Football Hall of Fame in 1952.

White was made an honorary fellow of Hertford College, Oxford.

White was posthumously awarded the Presidential Medal of Freedom in 2003 by President George W. Bush.

White was inducted into the Rocky Mountain Athletic Conference Hall of Fame on July 14, 2007, in addition to being a member of the College Football Hall of Fame and the University of Colorado's Athletic Hall of Fame, where he is enshrined as "The Greatest Buff Ever".

See also

 Demographics of the Supreme Court of the United States
 John F. Kennedy Supreme Court candidates
 List of justices of the Supreme Court of the United States
 List of justices of the Supreme Court of the United States by court composition
 List of law clerks of the Supreme Court of the United States (Chief Justice)
 List of law clerks of the Supreme Court of the United States (Seat 6)
 List of NCAA major college football yearly rushing leaders
 List of NCAA major college football yearly scoring leaders
 List of NCAA major college football yearly total offense leaders
 List of United States Supreme Court cases by the Burger Court
 List of United States Supreme Court cases by the Rehnquist Court
 List of United States Supreme Court cases by the Warren Court
 List of United States Supreme Court justices by time in office

Footnotes

References

Sources

Books

Journals

Newspapers

Further reading
 
 
 
 
 
 
 Woodward, Robert and Armstrong, Scott. The Brethren: Inside the Supreme Court (1979). ; . ; ; ; .

External links

 Byron White at the Biographical Directory of Federal Judges, a public domain publication of the Federal Judicial Center.
 Oyez Project, U.S. Supreme Court media, Byron R. White
 
 Byron White's season with the 1938 Pittsburgh Pirates
 University of Colorado Athletics Hall of Fame – Byron White
 C-SPAN – Life of Byron White, discussed by Dennis Hutchinson (2011)
 

1917 births
2002 deaths
20th-century American judges
Alumni of Hertford College, Oxford
All-American college football players
American athlete-politicians
American Rhodes Scholars
American Episcopalians
American football halfbacks
American men's basketball players
Basketball players from Denver
College Football Hall of Fame inductees
Colorado Buffaloes football players
Colorado Buffaloes men's basketball players
Colorado Democrats
Deaths from pneumonia in Colorado
Detroit Lions players
Law clerks of the Supreme Court of the United States
Lawyers from Denver
Military personnel from Colorado
Pittsburgh Pirates (football) players
Pittsburgh Steelers players
Players of American football from Denver
Presidential Medal of Freedom recipients
Sportspeople from Fort Collins, Colorado
United States Deputy Attorneys General
United States federal judges appointed by John F. Kennedy
United States Navy officers
United States Navy personnel of World War II
Justices of the Supreme Court of the United States
University of Colorado alumni
Yale Law School alumni